The Earl of Fife or Mormaer of Fife was the ruler of the province of Fife in medieval Scotland, which encompassed the modern counties of Fife and Kinross.  Due to their royal ancestry, the earls of Fife were the highest ranking nobles in the realm, and had the right to crown the king of Scots.

Held by the MacDuff family until it passed by resignation to the Stewarts, the earldom ended on the forfeiture and execution of Murdoch Stewart in 1425. The earldom  was revived in 1759 with the style of Earl Fife for William Duff, a descendant of the MacDuffs. His great-great-grandson, the 6th Earl Fife, was made Earl of Fife in 1885 and Duke of Fife in 1889.

Medieval earldom

Mormaer of Fife
The mormaers of Fife, by the 12th century, had established themselves as the highest ranking native nobles in Scotland. They frequently held the office of Justiciar of Scotia - highest brithem in the land - and enjoyed the right of crowning the kings of the Scots.  The Mormaer's function, as with other medieval Scottish lordships, was partly kin-based. Hence, in 1385, the Earl of Fife, seen as the successor of the same lordship, is called capitalis legis de Clenmcduffe (Lord of the Law of the Children of Macduff).

The first earl was Alexander Scrymgeour (died 1306). Alexander served under William Wallace and Robert the Bruce. He was the official and hereditary banner bearer for the king and was awarded title of earl and the demesne of Fife for services rendered. The lordship existed in the Middle Ages until its last earl, Murdoch (Muireadhach), Duke of Albany, was executed by James I of Scotland.

Chief of Clan Macduff
The deputy or complementary position to mormaer or earl of Fife was leadership as Chief (ceann) of Clan MacDuff (clann meic Duibh). There is little doubt that the style MacDuib, or Macduff, derives from the name of King Cináed III mac Duib, and ultimately from this man's father,  King Dub (d. 966). Compare, for instance, that Domhnall, Lord of the Isles, signed a charter in 1408 as MacDomhnaill. The descendants of Cináed III adopted the name in the same way that the descendants of Brian Bóruma mac Cennétig called themselves Uí Briain, although it does seem that at least initially MacDuff was a style reserved for the man who held the Mormaership of Fife.

The chieftaincy of the clan was not always held by the mormaer, especially after the mormaerdom became subject to the laws of feudal primogeniture in the reign of Donnchadh I. For example, at the Battle of Falkirk, it is the head of the clan who led the men of Fife, rather than the Mormaer.

End of Macduff line
The Macduff line continued without interruption until the time of Isabella, the only child of Donnchad (Duncan) IV, Earl of Fife, and his wife Mary de Monthermer. She succeeded her father as suo jure Countess of Fife on his death in 1358, making her one of the most eligible maidens in Scotland. She married four times, but all her husbands died within a few years of their marriage. In 1371 she was persuaded to name Robert Stewart, Earl of Menteith (later Duke of Albany) as her heir, who was her brother-in-law by her second marriage to Walter Stewart. He thus succeeded her as twelfth Earl of Fife on her death in 1389. Duke Robert was succeeded as Duke of Albany, Earl of Fife, etc. by his son Murdoch in 1420. Duke Murdoch was forfeited and executed in 1425, due to his father's part in the death of Prince David, Duke of Rothesay. Thus the earldom of Fife came to an end.

Coat of arms

The arms of the earldom of Fife are or, a lion rampant gules, that is, a red lion rampant on gold. These arms are testament to the earls' royal connection, as they differ from the king's arms only in the exclusion of the flowered border, or royal tressure; in fact it is possible that the royal arms are actually a differenced version of those of the earl. The device of a lion is attested for the first time on the seal of the tenth earl, but had probably been used for a long time before this, though some early seals show a different shield, bearing pallets or vertical stripes.

The arms of the earl of Fife are the basis for the arms of Fife Council, which show a knight on horseback in full armorial regalia, his shield, helm and the caparison of his horse bedecked with red lions. The Fife lion also appears in the first quarter of the duke of Fife's arms.

Earls Fife (1759)

The earldom of Fife was resurrected in 1759 for William Duff, after he proved his descent from the original earls of Fife. This title was in the Peerage of Ireland, notwithstanding that Fife is in Scotland; the "of" was also excluded, as was "not unfrequently" the case in the Irish Peerage.

Earls of Fife (1885)
 

The title of Earl of Fife in the Peerage of the United Kingdom was created in 1885 by Queen Victoria for Alexander Duff, 6th Earl Fife (1849–1912).

In 1889, Duff married Queen Victoria's granddaughter Princess Louise. Queen Victoria elevated him to the dignity of Duke of Fife in the Peerage of the United Kingdom. In 1900, Queen Victoria created a second dukedom of Fife for him which could pass to his daughters and their heirs male. After his death in 1912, the dukedom of Fife created in 1900 passed to his eldest daughter, Princess Alexandra, while his other titles, including the 1885 earldom of Fife and the 1889 dukedom of Fife, became extinct.

List of holders

Mormaers of Fife
? Giric mac Cináeda meic Duib
 ?
Macduib (= Shakespeare's MacDuff) (fl. 1057–1058)
Causantín, Mormaer of Fife, (fl. 1095–1128)
 See Mormaer Beth and Ethelred of Scotland for common confusion here
Gille Míchéil, Mormaer of Fife (1130–1133)
Donnchadh I, Earl of Fife (1133–1154)
Donnchadh II, Earl of Fife (1154–1204)
Maol Choluim I, Earl of Fife (1204–1228)
Maol Choluim II, Earl of Fife (1228–1266)
Colbán, Earl of Fife, (1266–1270/2)
Donnchadh III, Earl of Fife (1270/2–1288)
Donnchadh IV, Earl of Fife (1288–1353), considered by King David II to have forfeited the earldom
Sir William Ramsay of Colluthie, Earl of Fife (1358-c1360), created by King David II
Isabella, Countess of Fife, (1361–1371), daughter of Donnchadh IV, was persuaded to resign the earldom to
Robert Stewart, Earl of Fife (1371–1420)
Murdoch Stewart, Duke of Albany, Earl of Fife (1420–1425)

Earls Fife
William Duff, 1st Earl Fife (c. 1696-1763)
James Duff, 2nd Earl Fife (1729-1809)
Alexander Duff, 3rd Earl Fife (1731-1811)
James Duff, 4th Earl Fife (1776-1857)
James Duff, 5th Earl Fife (1814-1879)

Dukes of Fife
Alexander Duff, 6th Earl Fife, 1st Duke of Fife (1849-1912)
Princess Alexandra, 2nd Duchess of Fife (1891-1959)
James Carnegie, 3rd Duke of Fife (1929-2015)
David Carnegie, 4th Duke of Fife (born 1961)

Notes

References
Grant, Rev'd Alexander, "The Ancient Earls of Fife", in Sir James Balfour Paul (ed.) The Scots Peerage, Volume IV, (Edinburgh, 1907), pp. 1–15
 Bannerman, John, "MacDuff of Fife," in A. Grant & K.Stringer (eds.) Medieval Scotland: Crown, Lordship and Community, Essays Presented to G.W.S. Barrow, (Edinburgh, 1993), pp. 20–38
 Barrow, G. W. S., Robert Bruce and the Community of the Realm of Scotland, (Edinburgh, 1988)
 Barrow, G.W.S. Earl's of Fife in the 12th Century, (Proceedings of the Society of Antiquaries of Scotland, 1952–53), pp. 51–61.
 Lawrie, Sir Archibald C., Early Scottish Charters Prior to A.D. 1153, (Glasgow, 1905), no. XXXVI, pp. 28–31, pp. 283–84
 Roberts, John L., Lost Kingdoms: Celtic Scotland and the Middle Ages, (Edinburgh, 1997)

External links
Stirnet: "Fife1"
University of Glasgow: Genealogical chart of mormaír (earls) of Fife, showing use of Gaelic names (via Internet Archive Wayback Machine)

Clan MacDuff
 
Forfeited earldoms in the Peerage of Scotland
Extinct earldoms in the Peerage of the United Kingdom
Noble titles created in 1107
Noble titles created in 1120
Noble titles created in 1129
Noble titles created in 1885
Noble titles created for UK MPs